Shha with descender (Ԧ ԧ; italics: Ԧ ԧ) is a letter of the Cyrillic script.  Its form is derived from the Cyrillic letter Shha (Һ һ Һ һ) by the addition of a descender to the right leg.

Shha with descender is used in the alphabets of the Tati and Juhuri languages, where it represents the  glottal stop .

Computing codes

See also
Ⱨ ⱨ : Latin letter H with descender
Cyrillic characters in Unicode

References

External links
Unicode definition

Cyrillic letters with diacritics
Letters with descender (diacritic)